The Chappell Nunataks are a group of nunataks  west of the central part of the Cobham Range. They were named by the New Zealand Geological Survey Antarctic Expedition (1964–65) for J. Chappell, geologist with the expedition.

References 

Nunataks of Oates Land